Boana xerophylla is a species of frog in the family Hylidae. It's found in northern South America.

Taxonomy 
Boana xerophylla was described in 1841 as Hyla xerophylla. However, for decades in the 1900s, it was regarded as a synonym of Boana crepitans, until it was resurrected as a separate species in 2017. In 2021, the Boana xerophylla populations north of the Orinoco river were separated as a new species, Boana platanera. A population from Suriname has sometimes been called Boana fuentei, but it's currently classified as a synonym of Boana xerophylla.

Description 
The dorsal coloration of Boana xerophylla ranges from dark brown to green.

Distribution 
Boana xerophylla is found in northern Brazil, French Guiana, Guyana, Suriname, and Venezuela south of the Orinoco river.

References

Boana
Amphibians of Brazil
Amphibians of French Guiana
Amphibians of Guyana
Amphibians of Suriname
Amphibians of Venezuela
Taxa named by André Marie Constant Duméril
Taxa named by Gabriel Bibron
Amphibians described in 1841
Taxonomy articles created by Polbot